The flowerpot technique is an animal testing technique used in sleep deprivation studies. It is designed to allow NREM sleep but prevent restful REM sleep. The test is usually performed with rodents.

Technique
During sleep deprivation studies, a laboratory rat is housed in a water filled enclosure with a single small, dry platform (traditionally, an upside down flowerpot in a bucket of water, from which the technique is named) just above the water line (>1cm). While in NREM sleep, the rat retains muscle tone and can sleep on top of the platform. When the rat enters the more meaningful REM sleep, it lose muscle tone and fall off the platform into the water, then climb back up to avoid drowning, and reenter NREM sleep, or its nose become submerged, shocking the rat back into an awakened state. This allows the rat to physically rest to avoid fatigue, but deprives it of REM sleep needed for normal mental function. The rat can then be subjected to physical and mental tasks and its performance is compared with the performance of rested control rodents, or its tissue (particulary the brain) be analysed.

See also
Disk-over-water method

References

 
 
 
Animal testing techniques
Ethically disputed research practices towards animals
Sleeplessness and sleep deprivation